Nelly Hedwig Diener (5 February 1912 – 27 July 1934) was a Swiss flight attendant. She was the first female flight attendant in Europe.

She died in the 1934 Swissair Tuttlingen accident, along with the other two crew members and nine passengers.

See also
Ellen Church
Heinrich Kubis

References

External links

Flight attendants
Swissair
Victims of aviation accidents or incidents in Germany
Victims of aviation accidents or incidents in 1934
1912 births
1934 deaths